Ben Macdui (meaning "MacDuff's mountain") is the second-highest mountain in Scotland and all of the British Isles, after Ben Nevis, and the highest of the Cairngorm Mountains. Ben Macdui sits on the southwestern edge of the Cairngorm plateau, overlooking the Lairig Ghru pass to the west, and Loch Etchachan to the east. It lies on the boundary between the historic counties of Aberdeenshire and Banffshire.

Before the production of accurate maps of Scotland in the 19th century, it was not known for certain that Ben Nevis was the highest point in Britain, and it was often thought that Ben Macdui might be higher. Following surveys of both peaks in 1846–47, Ben Nevis was confirmed as the higher.  The summit of the mountain has a direction indicator erected in 1925 by the Cairngorm Club of Aberdeen in memory of former president Alexander Copland. The indicator shows the directions of the most noteworthy mountains that can be seen from the summit in clear weather.

Snow patches have been known to persist at various locations on Ben Macdui, most notably Garbh Uisge Beag. The mountain is said to be haunted by the legendary Am Fear Liath Mòr (Big Grey Man).

History

After the defeat of Domnall mac Uilliam in 1187, Donnchad II, Earl of Fife, acquired Stratha'an, a territory stretching from Ballindalloch to Ben Macdui. Because the mountain marked the western boundary of Donnchad's territory, Gaelic scholar historian F.C. Diack and place-name scholar Professor G.W.S. Barrow have suggested that the mountain took its name from Donnchad's family, the Mac Duibh. Another suggestion is that the name comes from the Gaelic for "black pig", referring to its shape. A 19th-Century Ordnance Survey name book suggests the name signifies "The Black Son mountain".

In 1810 a Rev Dr Keith surveyed the heights of several Cairngorm summits using a barometer, estimating the height of Ben Macdui to be . This sparked interest in whether it, or Ben Nevis, was the highest summit in Scotland. The Ordnance Survey built a trig point on the summit in 1847 in order to accurately survey the height, confirming that Ben Nevis was indeed the higher. The surveyors also built a small shelter that became known as the "Sappers' Bothy", the remains of which can still be seen. Following these surveys, there were plans to build a cairn on top of Ben Macdui to make its height greater than Ben Nevis, but these plans did not come to fruition.

Queen Victoria hiked to the summit on 7 October 1859, aged forty. About her experience, she wrote: "It had a sublime and solemn effect, so wild, so solitary – no one but ourselves and our little party there ... I had a little whisky and water, as the people declared pure water would be too chilling."

During the Second World War commando troops training in the Cairngorms visited the summit of Ben Macdui, building small shelters to the northeast of the summit. In early 1940 a plane crashed at the top of the Allt a' Choire Mhòir, to the northwest of the summit.

Climbing
Probably the easiest route of ascent is from the Coire Cas car park at the foot of Cairngorm Ski Centre by a path that leads up over slowly rising moorland. This route is about 7 km (4 mi) long; a somewhat longer route allows one also to climb Cairn Gorm. One possible alternative route follows the path coming up from Loch Etchachan. This loch may be reached from Loch Avon to the north or by coming up from Glen Derry to the south. Other routes include coming over Derry Cairngorm, or via the Lairig Ghru pass, which lies to the west of Ben Macdui.

Nearly all these routes are long days by Scottish standards. When coming from the south it is common to use a bicycle to cover the 5 km (3½ mi) from the road end at Linn of Dee to Derry Lodge at the southern end of the massif.

Am Fear Liath Mòr
The area of Ben Macdui is said to be haunted by the legendary Am Fear Liath Mòr ('the Big Grey Man') or 'Greyman'. There have been several accounts of an unnatural presence, with mountaineer Norman Collie claiming to have heard footsteps before fleeing from the summit in terror.

Gallery

References

Citations

Bibliography
 
 Bennett, Donald, et al., The Munros, SMC Hillwalkers' Guide (Scottish Mountaineering Trust, 1985).

External links
 Ben Macdui is at coordinates 
 Computer-generated virtual panorama from Ben Macdui
 Short documentary film about The Big Grey Man of Ben Macdui

Munros
Marilyns of Scotland
Mountains and hills of the Cairngorms
Mountains and hills of Moray
Mountains and hills of Aberdeenshire
Places and place names on Mar Lodge Estate
Highest points of historic Scottish counties
One-thousanders of Scotland